Killarney Motor Racing Complex, whose main race track is also known as Killarney International Raceway, is a motor racing complex in Milnerton Rural, Cape Town, South Africa. It first saw action in 1947.

History

In 1959/60 the track was upgraded and rebuilt to conform to the required FIA standard for the 1500 cc Formula One cars of the time. The design was entrusted to Edgar Hoal, a leading racing driver and roads engineer, who also supervised its construction.

The Western Cape then had its first taste of international Formula One racing when the non-championship Cape Grand Prix was held at Killarney on 17 December 1960, and was won by Stirling Moss in a Porsche. Since then the complex has grown to include every facet of circuit motorsport. So much so that Killarney currently hosts all forms of main circuit racing, as well as motocross, karting, super motards, stock car, drag racing and European Truck Racing as a one-off event.

The circuit will host the first FIA World Championship race in South Africa since the 1990s with the inaugural World RX of South Africa to be held in 2017 for the FIA World Rallycross Championship.

Track features

The main track has the unusual feature of having two pit lanes on the home stretch. The racing complex also has a drag racing strip and a go-kart track.

Additionally, turn 9 can be turned into a proper chicane for the purposes of motorcycle races.

For the World RX of South Africa, the northwestern portion of the circuit was used, with an extra dirt road added to its infield.

References

External links
 http://www.wpmc.co.za/ Official Website.
 http://www.wpmcmotorcycles.co.za/ Motorcycle section web site of WPMC.

Motorsport venues in South Africa
Sports venues in Cape Town
World Rallycross circuits